Vennisfjellet is a mountain in Vang Municipality in Innlandet county, Norway. The mountain is surrounded by several other notable mountains including Mjellknapp to the northeast, and the mountains Trollfonneggi and Skræmetindene to the north.

See also
List of mountains of Norway by height

References

Vang, Innlandet
Mountains of Innlandet